Ryan Yaviel Sánchez Estrada (born 22 June 1998) is a Puerto Rican middle-distance runner specialising in the 800 metres. He won a bronze medal at the 2019 Pan American Games. As still a junior, he represented his country at the 2017 World Championships in London without advancing from the heats.

International competitions

Personal bests
Outdoor
800 metres – 1:44.82 (Ponce 2019)
1500 metres – 3:49.33 (Gainesville 2019)
Indoor
One mile – 4:29.16 (Winston Salem 2019)

References

1998 births
Living people
Puerto Rican male middle-distance runners
World Athletics Championships athletes for Puerto Rico
Athletes (track and field) at the 2019 Pan American Games
Pan American Games medalists in athletics (track and field)
Pan American Games bronze medalists for Puerto Rico
Medalists at the 2019 Pan American Games
Central American and Caribbean Games medalists in athletics
Competitors at the 2018 Central American and Caribbean Games
Central American and Caribbean Games silver medalists for Puerto Rico
Athletes (track and field) at the 2020 Summer Olympics
Olympic track and field athletes of Puerto Rico
21st-century Puerto Rican people